A Snake of June (Rokugatsu no hebi) is a 2002 Japanese film directed by Shinya Tsukamoto. His seventh film, it is notable for its monochrome blue cinematography tinted in post production. It won the Kinematrix Film Award and the San Marco Special Jury Award at the Venice Film Festival.

Plot
Set in an anonymous Japanese metropolis, the film tells the tale of shy career woman, Rinko, and Shigehiko, her hygiene-obsessed, workaholic husband. The couple explore their sexuality in a number of ways, causing their lives to be disrupted.

Cast
 Asuka Kurosawa as Rinko Tatsumi
 Yuji Kohtari as Shigehiko (as Yuji Koutari)
 Shinya Tsukamoto as Iguchi
 Masato Tsujioka
 Susumu Terajima 
 Tomorowo Taguchi 
 Shūji Ōtsuki 
 Tomoko Matsumoto 
 Mansaku Fuwa

References

External links
 
 

2002 films
2000s Japanese-language films
Psychological drama films
Japanese psychological thriller films
Japanese erotic thriller films
Pink films
Japanese psychological horror films
Japanese horror drama films
Films directed by Shinya Tsukamoto
Films scored by Chu Ishikawa
Japanese erotic films
2000s Japanese films